Sheridan Peak is a peak rising to 955 m near the head of Nordenskjold Glacier, South Georgia. During the British South Georgia Expedition, 1954–55, the feature was called "Thin Ridge." It was named by the United Kingdom Antarctic Place-Names Committee (UK-APC) in 1988 after Maj. James G. Sheridan, Royal Marines, who accepted the surrender of the Argentine garrison at King Edward Point, April 25, 1982.

Mountains and hills of South Georgia